Nina F. Elgo (born June 18, 1962) is a Judge of the Connecticut Appellate Court.

Education

Elgo received her Bachelor of Arts from Connecticut College in 1984 and her Juris Doctor from Georgetown University Law Center in 1990.

State judicial career

Prior to her appointment to the Appellate Court, she served as a Superior Court judge since May 5, 2004. At the time of her appointment she was the first Asian Pacific American judge appointed to the Connecticut Superior Court.

Appointment to state appellate court

On May 2, 2017 Elgo was nominated to the Connecticut Appellate Court by Dan Malloy. The General Assembly confirmed her appointment on May 25, 2017. With her confirmation, it marked the first time in the court's history where women held the majority. She is the first Asian Pacific American judge appointed to the Connecticut Appellate Court.

Awards and recognition

In 2015, she was honored with the Native Daughter of Norwich Award; in 2014, she was the recipient of the CT Asian Pacific American Bar Association Impact Award; and in 2013, she was the recipient of the Edwin Archer Randolph Diversity Award. As the first Asian Pacific American judge in Connecticut, she was honored in 2006 by the Connecticut Trial Lawyers Association Women's Caucus as a “Trailblazer in the Connecticut Judiciary.” She was also a recipient of the 2007 Connecticut Bar Association's Young Lawyers Section Diversity Award.

Personal

Elgo is married to attorney Christopher Kriesen and they have a daughter.

See also
List of Asian American jurists

References

External links
Official Biography on State of Connecticut Judicial Branch website

Living people
1962 births
20th-century American lawyers
21st-century American judges
American jurists of Asian descent
Connecticut College alumni
Georgetown University Law Center alumni
Judges of the Connecticut Appellate Court
People from Groton, Connecticut
Superior court judges in the United States
20th-century American women lawyers
21st-century American women judges